Tishomingo Creek is a stream in the U.S. state of Mississippi.  It is named after Tishomingo, a Chickasaw chieftain.

References

Rivers of Mississippi
Rivers of Lee County, Mississippi
Rivers of Union County, Mississippi
Mississippi placenames of Native American origin